Self-mortification may refer to:

Voluntary pain or privation to oneself
 in religious practice generally, mortification of the flesh
Mortification (theology)
 Mortification in Catholic theology

Involuntary
 Sometimes used interchangeably with mortification of the self, personality disruption done to an individual in a total institution or a setting with similar characteristics